Tilya Damla Sönmez (born 3 May 1987) is a Turkish actress and voiceover artist. She gained worldwide recognition for her movies Sibel and I Am You. Her prominent TV roles include Ceylan in Bir Aşk Hikayesi, Gülru in Güllerin Savaşı, and Efsun in Çukur.

Early life and education 
Damla Sönmez is an only child born to parents of Circassian descent. Her father is an engineer and programmer, and her mother works as an architect. Her biggest passion as a child was theater and cinema. She began to study at theater studios early on. During school years, Damla constantly played on stage, and began to appear in commercials on television. In those years she was promised a great future already.

After graduating from Saint Joseph French High School in Istanbul, she was accepted to Université de La Sorbonne Nouvelle Paris in the Theatre department. She studied for a year in Paris before being awarded a scholarship to the Yeditepe University Fine Arts Theatre Department in Istanbul. Sönmez also studied semi-timed 2 years violin and 1 year piano in Mimar Sinan University State Conservatory. She had later attended Jillian O’Dowd's Contemporary Acting Workshop at the London Dramatic School of Arts and worked with Stuart Burney at the Black Nexxus Academy in New York.

Career

Films 
In 2009, she starred in Bornova Bornova and won the "Best Supporting Actress" at the 46th Golden Orange Film Festival, alongside other awards at the Sadri Alışık Awards and the Flying Broom International Women's Film Festival. She became the Young President of the festival at the 18th Broom Broom Women Films Festival in 2015 and she won the 21st Golden Boll Film Festival and the Best Actress Award at the Milano International Film Festival (MIFF) for her role in the film "Sea Level (Deniz Seviyesi)".

Television series 
In her television career, she played supporting roles in hit series Emret Komutanım, Gece Gündüz, and Türkan. A turning point in her television career was when she was cast as a bride who suffers from loss of memory in the series Şubat. Her first leading role was Bir Aşk Hikayesi, an adaptation of I'm Sorry, I Love You, where she played the role of Ceylan alongside actor Seçkin Özdemir. 

In 2014, she starred in the TV series Güllerin Savaşı as Gülru alongside Canan Ergüder. In 2019, she joined season 3 of Çukur portraying Efsun Kent, a character that gained a lot of media attention. Sönmez sang many classic Turkish arabesque songs as part of her role in Çukur including "Durdurun Dünyayı", "Su Ver Leyla", "Sen Affetsen Ben Affetmem", "Sorma", and "Son Mektup". In 2021, it was announced that she will star in the TV series Aziz as Dilruba alongside actor Murat Yıldırım.

Web series 
In 2017, she played the main role in an episode of BluTV's anthology series 7 Yüz (7 Faces). In 2020, she portrayed Ana in Netflix's historical docudrama Rise of Empires: Ottoman. In 2021, she joined season 2 of BluTV's hit series Saygı (Respect) as Arya Şahin, a public prosecutor.

Filmography

Theater

Awards and nominations

References

External links
Facebook page Damla Sönmez 
 

1987 births
Living people
Turkish stage actresses
Turkish film actresses
Turkish television actresses
21st-century Turkish actresses
St. Joseph High School Istanbul alumni
Turkish people of Circassian descent
Actresses from Istanbul